Robert Joseph Barrett III (born January 29, 1969) is the guitarist for death metal band Cannibal Corpse. He played with the band from 1993 to 1997 and rejoined in 2005.  He has cited Gary Moore, Malcolm Young, Randy Rhoads, Eddie Van Halen, Tony Iommi and Steve Vai, among others, as his influences. He currently resides in Tampa, Florida.

Career 
Barrett was born in Buffalo, New York. He started his professional career in 1990 when he formed the band Solstice with drummer Alex Marquez and guitar player Dennis Muñoz. The band recorded a demo in 1991 produced by Jim Morris and signed a record deal with the German label SPV/Steamhammer. In 1992 they released their debut album entitled Solstice (the name changed to "The Sentencing" on some pressings). That same year, Barrett and Marquez decided to join Malevolent Creation after their previous drummer and second guitar player didn't show up to a rehearsal, putting Solstice on hiatus. They took part on the recording of Retribution and toured with the band.

Cannibal Corpse

In 1993, Barrett was contacted by Alex Webster and asked to join Cannibal Corpse, shortly after the recording of Tomb of the Mutilated, as a guitar fill-in for Bob Rusay. He stayed with the band for the subsequent tours and eventually became a permanent member. He recorded the 1994 album The Bleeding and the 1996 album Vile. He also made a brief cameo appearance with the band in the 1994 film Ace Ventura: Pet Detective starring Jim Carrey. In 1997 Barrett left Cannibal Corpse after an argument over musical differences between him and the other band members. While he was replaced by Pat O'Brien, Barrett rejoined Malevolent Creation in 1998 and stayed with the band for six years. In 2005, Barrett expressed to the members of Cannibal Corpse his desire to come back to the band and after careful consideration, Barrett was finally welcomed back and replaced Jack Owen. Since then, he has been featured on the albums Kill, Evisceration Plague, Torture, A Skeletal Domain, Red Before Black, & Violence Unimagined

HatePlow
In late 1994 right after Malevolent Creation recorded their third album, Barrett formed the death metal band HatePlow with guitarist Phil Fasciana and late drummer "Crazy" Larry Hawke, both members of Malevolent Creation. Barrett was the original vocalist, the band eventually got Kyle Symons to join on vocals due to Barrett's commitment to Cannibal Corpse Although HatePlow was intended initially as mere a fun side-project, the trio recorded a four-song demo that enjoyed a wide spread throughout the underground trading circuit. After his departure from Cannibal Corpse Barrett extended his commitment to Malevolent Creation & HatePlow and participated in the recording of the albums Everybody Dies and The Only Law Is Survival which came out in 1998 and 2000 respectively. In 2004, he left HatePlow. The same year Barrett left, the "Moshpit Murder" compilation was released which features tracks recorded live during "The Only Law Is Survival" U.S tour with Stormtroopers Of Death in 2000, tracks from their 1996 demo, and one song from their 1999 demo that was done with a drum machine.

Collaborations and side-projects
Since the 2000s Barrett has made a few guest appearances, providing extra guitar playing for bands such as Eulogy, Hollenthon, Infernäl Mäjesty, Pro-Pain and Unearthed. In 2005 Barrett joined in on the recording of the Roadrunner United album The All-Star Sessions where he played guitar on the tracks "Annihilation by the Hands of God" and "Constitution Down".

In 2019 Rob Barrett recorded with death metal band Deicide for a tribute album for the 40th anniversary of shock punk-metal hardcore legends The Dayglo Abortions titled 
"Fuck The World If It Can't Take a Joke". 
The track recorded was "Inside My Head" from their 1985 release Feed Us a Fetus.

In the mid-2000's Barrett planned on starting a hardcore band with J.C. Dwyer on drums and Jonathan Buske on bass. It is currently unknown if a name was decided or if any recordings exist.

Equipment

Guitars
Barrett is currently endorsed by Dean Guitars and uses their custom guitars, mainly Cadillac's but also V's and Z's. All of his guitars are equipped with either an EMG set or a Fishman Fluence set and are tuned to A# and G# Standard, he also tunes his guitars like the top 6 strings of a 7 string guitar. Around 2007 Dean Guitars produced a signature model in limited numbers called the Cadi-Kill. In the past Barrett used to play two Gibson Les Paul's, a Jackson Dinky, briefly a B.C. Rich Bich, a Custom ESP M-1, and a Charvel 475 that was also in Ace Ventura: Pet Detective, the Charvel featured stickers from bands such as Black Flag, Biohazard, Slapshot, Wasted Youth and Dead Kennedys. His Les Paul's are now only used for studio recording. He now uses Fishman Fluence pickups in his signature guitars.

Amplifiers
Like O'Brien, Barrett uses Mesa Boogie amplifiers, such as the Dual Rectifier (old 2 channel version), the Triple Rectifier and, more recently, Mark V. For cabinets, he uses Crate, Marshall and Mesa Boogie 4 x 12", which are loaded with Celestion Vintage 30 speakers. Before settling for Mesa Boogie, Barrett used Crate and Marshall amplifiers.

Effects and accessories
Barrett runs a few pedals, namely an ISP Technologies Decimator noise gate, Boss MT-2 Metal Zone, Boss TU-2 Chromatic Tuner and a Maxon ST-9 pro+ Super tube. The units are connected with Monster cables.

Discography
Solstice
 1991: Demo
 1992: Solstice

Malevolent Creation
 1992: Retribution
 1998: The Fine Art of Murder
 2000: Envenomed
 2002: The Will to Kill
 2004: Warkult

Cannibal Corpse
 1994: The Bleeding
 1996: Vile
 2006: Kill
 2009: Evisceration Plague
 2012: Torture
 2014: A Skeletal Domain
 2017: Red Before Black
 2021: Violence Unimagined

Eulogy
 2010: Burden of Certainty (demo)

HatePlow
 1996: Demo
 1998: Everybody Dies
 2000: The Only Law Is Survival
 2004: Moshpit Murder

Guest appearances
Hollenthon
 2001: With Vilest of Worms to Dwell

Infernäl Mäjesty
 2007: Demon God (EP)

Pro-Pain
 2008: No End in Sight

Roadrunner United
 2005: The All-Star Sessions

Unearthed
 2007: Imposition of Faith

References

External links 
 Cannibal Corpse website

1970 births
Cannibal Corpse members
Death metal musicians
Living people
Malevolent Creation members
Rhythm guitarists